SchoolsFirst Federal Credit Union is a federally chartered credit union that serves the educational community in California.  It is headquartered in Tustin, California, and has branches throughout California. Before April 14, 2008, it was named Orange County Teachers Federal Credit Union, or OCTFCU.

History
SchoolsFirst FCU was founded in 1934 by a group of 125 school employees. They pooled $1,200 and established Orange County Teachers Credit Union with a California state charter. A switch to a federal charter in 1985 added Federal to its name.

At the end of 2017, SchoolsFirst FCU reported $14.12 billion in assets, making it the fifth-largest credit union in the United States by asset size. Net income for that year was $119.06 million, and total capital $1.63 billion. Their 11.11% capital to asset ratio is one of the best in the U.S. banking industry. They reported having over 800,000 members in 2019.

As of December 31, 2021, its asset size has grown to $26.9 billion, capital to asset ratio of 9.61%, and the total membership has increased to 1.2 million.

Merger with Schools Financial Credit Union 
The merger was official on January 1, 2020, with the integration of both credit unions data occurring on November 1, 2020.

In early 2019, SchoolsFirst and Schools Financial announced plans to merge, pending regulatory and member approval. Both credit unions stated that no branches or employees would be closed or laid off as a result of the merger. The merger would combine assets and members, totaling $17.1 billion in assets and over one million members, per their respective announcements. The merged credit union operates under the name and charter of SchoolsFirst Federal Credit Union, effective January 1, 2020.

Products and services 
SchoolsFirst offers their services through their 66 Branches and 28,000 Fee free ATMs in COOP Financial Services Network. They serve their members in the following California counties:
Imperial County
Kern County
Los Angeles County
Orange County
Riverside County
San Bernardino County
San Diego County
San Luis Obispo County
Santa Barbara County
Ventura County
According to a recent report from the Credit Union National Association (CUNA), SchoolsFirst FCU provided more than an estimated $232 million in direct financial benefits to their Members in 2020, resulting in a savings of $470 for each Member households.

During the financial hardship created by COVID-19 and wildfires, SchoolsFirst FCU reversed $4 Million  in Fees and gave $1.28 Billion in loan assistance.

Recognition 
They were voted Best Credit Union in Orange County, California, in 2020 by the Orange County Register and LA Times Reader's Choice. They were also voted Forbes Best In-State Credit Union in California 2020 and 2021

Field of membership
SchoolsFirst FCU's current field of membership is the entire state of California. They serve employees of the following educational entities (serving both classified and certificated employees):

Public elementary and secondary schools that are listed as a private school in the California Department of Education School Directory 
County superintendents of schools 
Community colleges
Authorized colleges and universities that offer degree programs 
Authorized education foundations

Membership eligibility 
SchoolsFirst serves educational communities in California. Below groups are eligible to apply to join:

 A current school employee
 An immediate family member of a SchoolsFirst FCU Member, including spouse, domestic partner, parent, sibling, child, grandparent or grandchild
 An employee of a company whose primary business is to provide a direct service to an eligible school or district in California
 A college student enrolled in an education program with a student teaching requirement
 Members of the boards of trustees of eligible schools
 Educators who have retired from one of the above eligible educational entities, who are receiving a pension or annuity from that entity's retirement program, such as CalSTRS or CalPERS
Once someone joins the credit union, they are a member for life even if they change careers, retire or move out of state.

References

External links
Official website

Credit unions based in California
Companies based in Santa Ana, California
Privately held companies based in California
Banks established in 1934
1934 establishments in California